The 1965 Coquitlam massacre was a familicide that occurred in Coquitlam. Leonard Hogue shot his family and himself.

Shooting
At approximately 1:30 a.m. on April 20, 1965, Leonard Hogue shot dead his wife and six children with a .357 magnum revolver and then shot himself. Hogue's body lay on the master bedroom floor. His wife's body lay in bed. The bodies of two children lay in their beds. The bodies of the other four children were in different areas of the house due to them fleeing. Everyone including Hogue, was killed by a bullet to the head. The bodies were found on the same day after officials wondered why Hogue did not come to work.

Perpetrator
Leonard Raymond Hogue moved from Saint Boniface, and settled in Vancouver with his wife and two children.  He graduated from the Vancouver Police Department in 1956 and was the pistol shooting champion of his class. At first he was a patrolman, and, after some time, he was transferred to the city prison. In 1961 he had six children. In the early 1960s, Hogue and another police officer committed a series of thefts of bags of cash from Dairy Queen's freezers. At the time in the Vancouver area, a series of robberies were committed at the homes of wealthy people who were on vacation and reported their absence to the police. In November 1961, a gun shop was looted, and 14 guns were stolen. These were used in further robberies. In 1962, Hogue and two other police officers robbed a bank. Hogue then bought a house in the affluent Coquitlam district. In 1964-5 they committed two unsuccessful robberies. At that time, suspicions arose that police officers could be involved in the robbery. On February 11, 1965, Hogue and three other police officers robbed a train carrying banknotes for destruction in which they stole $1.2 million. The bills were drilled with three inch holes rendering them unusable. One of the robbers restored some of the bills. On April 17, 1965, two robbers were arrested after a bartender called police after they consistently paid with patched bills. The next morning Hogue learned that three members of his gang had been arrested. The next morning, on the way to work, he had an accident. It was later described as a suicide attempt. At around 6 pm, another police officer lent him a .357 magnum revolver. This revolver was used to kill the family.

References

1965 in British Columbia
1965 murders in Canada
1965 mass shootings in Canada
April 1965 events in Canada
Coquitlam
Deaths by firearm in British Columbia
Family murders
Mass shootings in Canada
Massacres in Canada
Murder in British Columbia
Murder–suicides in Canada
Massacres in 1965